Dicaelus laevipennis is a species of ground beetle in the family Carabidae. It is found in North America.

Subspecies
These three subspecies belong to the species Dicaelus laevipennis:
 Dicaelus laevipennis abbreviatus Bates, 1891
 Dicaelus laevipennis flohri Bates, 1878
 Dicaelus laevipennis laevipennis LeConte, 1847

References

Further reading

 

Harpalinae
Articles created by Qbugbot
Beetles described in 1847